Shirley Ruth Englehorn (December 12, 1940 – October 2, 2022) was an American professional golfer.  Nicknamed "Dimples", she won 11 tournaments during her LPGA Tour career, including one major, the 1970 LPGA Championship.

Early life and amateur career
Englehorn was born on December 12, 1940,  in Caldwell, Idaho, where she was raised.  She first played golf when she was six years old, having been introduced to the sport by Shirley Spork, one of the thirteen founders of the LPGA, and also studied with Johnny Revolta, an 18-time PGA Tour winner and the PGA Championship victor in 1935.

Englehorn won numerous amateur and open events.  These included the McCall Open (1957 and 1958), the Idaho Open (1957 to 1959), and the Pacific Northwest Amateur (1958).  She also won the Oregon Open in 1959, and won the Dorothy Pease Trophy (Trans-Miss) when she was fifteen, the youngest player to win the honor.

Professional career
After graduation from Caldwell High School in 1958, Englehorn turned pro at age 18 in 1959 and joined the LPGA Tour. She was sponsored by the Athletic Round Table of Spokane from 1960 through 1962. Despite a career-threatening equestrian accident in Georgia in March 1960, Englehorn recovered and won her first tournament at age 21 in July 1962 at the Women's Eastern Open in Sutton, Massachusetts. She won a total of 11 events on the LPGA Tour, including one major championship, the LPGA Championship in 1970 in a playoff over Kathy Whitworth, her third victory at Sutton.

Englehorn led the tour that season in wins with four. Five years earlier in 1965, she suffered injuries in an automobile accident and missed much of the season. Englehorn was awarded the Ben Hogan Award in early 1968 by the Golf Writers Association of America in honor of her successful comeback from injuries. She had surgery on her ankle in 1971 and 1973 and in each case returned to compete.  She later became a golf instructor, and was conferred the LPGA Teacher of the Year Award in 1978.  She made her last LPGA appearance in 1979.

Personal life
Englehorn died at Penrose Hospital in Colorado Springs, Colorado, on October 2, 2022, at the age of 81.

Professional wins (12)

LPGA Tour wins (11)

LPGA Tour playoff record (3–2)

Other wins (1)
1964 Haig & Haig Scotch Foursome (with Sam Snead)

Major championships

Wins (1)

1 Won in an 18-hole playoff. Englehorn: 74, Whitworth: 78

See also
 List of golfers with most LPGA Tour wins

References

External links
 
 
 Page on the Engelhorn family site

American female golfers
LPGA Tour golfers
Winners of LPGA major golf championships
Golfers from Idaho
People from Caldwell, Idaho
1940 births
2022 deaths
21st-century American women